Gaudence Cassian Kayombo (born 25 July 1955) is a Tanzanian CCM politician and Member of Parliament for Mbinga East constituency since 2005.

References

1955 births
Living people
Chama Cha Mapinduzi MPs
Tanzanian MPs 2010–2015
University of Dar es Salaam alumni